Ysbyty Cwm Cynon (English: Cynon Valley Hospital) is a health facility on New Road, Mountain Ash, Rhondda Cynon Taf, Wales. It is managed by the Cwm Taf Morgannwg University Health Board.

History
The facility was commissioned to replace Aberdare General Hospital, Mountain Ash General Hospital and St Tydfil's Hospital. It was designed by HLM and built by Vinci Construction at a cost of £70 million and opened in April 2012. Lesley Griffiths, the Minister for Health and Social Services, opened the dental unit at the hospital in October 2012.

References

Hospitals in Rhondda Cynon Taf
Hospitals established in 2012
2012 establishments in Wales
Hospital buildings completed in 2012
Buildings and structures in Rhondda Cynon Taf
NHS hospitals in Wales
Cwm Taf Morgannwg University Health Board
Mountain Ash, Rhondda Cynon Taf